Provjereno is a Croatian investigative journalism television news magazine that is broadcast on Nova TV. The show was launched in 2007, and airs Thursdays at 10 pm. It is hosted by Ivana Paradžiković.

Provjereno showcases investigative journalism reports which focus on social and political problems in Croatia, but is also well known for its experimental reports and its occasionally more light-hearted segments.

Because the show often deals with corruption and crime, over the years many of the journalists have received threats. Despite this Provjereno is credited with exposing many cases of crime, corruption and governmental negligence in Croatia.

Format
Provjereno follows the typical television news magazine format and features four stories every episode. Each story is introduced by the presenter after which the story segment itself is shown.

History
Provjereno began airing in September 2007 and was, for its first two seasons, hosted by Marija Miholjek. In 2009 Ivana Paradžiković took over as host and managing editor of the show.

Journalists and staff
Current
 Mato Barišić (2007–present)
 Ema Branica (2008–present)
 Danka Derifaj (2007–present)
 Maja Medaković (2009–present)
 Domagoj Mikić (2012–present)
 Josipa Pletikosić (2013–present)

Awards and nominations
Provjereno has repeatedly been recognized by the public and media as one of the few examples of investigative journalism in Croatia. Ivana Pradžiković received the “Joško Kulušić” award of the Croatian Helsinki Committee for promoting human rights, as well as the “Večernjakova ruža” person of the year award. Danka Derifaj received the “Velebitska degenija” award two years in a row for her contribution to environmental protection, as well as the "Marija Jurić-Zagorka" award of the Croatian Journalists' Association.

See also
Nova TV

External links
Provjereno web site

Croatian television news shows
2007 Croatian television series debuts
Nova TV (Croatia) original programming